Abraham Lincoln Keister (September 10, 1852 – May 26, 1917) was a Republican member of the U.S. House of Representatives from Pennsylvania.

Biography
Abraham L. Keister was born in Upper Tyrone Township, Pennsylvania. After graduating from Otterbein College in Westerville, Ohio in 1874, he studied law, was admitted to the bar by the supreme court of Ohio in 1878, and commenced practice in Columbus, Ohio.

In 1882, he moved to Fayette County, Pennsylvania, where he engaged in the manufacture of coke. Seven years later, he organized the First National Bank of Scottdale, Pennsylvania, and served continuously as its president for twenty-eight years.

In 1901, he organized the Scottdale Savings & Trust Co., and remained connected with this financial institution until his death. He also served as a member of the Scottdale Board of Education for more than twenty years.

Elected as a Republican to the Sixty-third and Sixty-fourth Congresses, he was an unsuccessful candidate for renomination in 1916, and resumed his former business pursuits until he died at his home in Scottdale on May 26, 1917. He was interred in the Scottdale Cemetery.

References

1852 births
1917 deaths
Otterbein University alumni
American bankers
Ohio lawyers
Politicians from Columbus, Ohio
People from Fayette County, Pennsylvania
People from Westmoreland County, Pennsylvania
Republican Party members of the United States House of Representatives from Pennsylvania
19th-century American politicians
Lawyers from Columbus, Ohio
19th-century American lawyers
19th-century American businesspeople